Silver Spoon is a Russian crime drama television series produced by Sreda for Channel One Russia. It debuted in 2014. Silver Spoon was the first Russian television show to be acquired by Netflix.

Plot

Season One
Igor Sokolovsky is the son of a very rich and high ranking Russian oligarch. He has received a legal education but is not in a hurry to find work for himself. Igor's parents provide for him everything and he spends all his time partying in nightclubs. While defending a friend, he gets into a fight with two policemen. His father, Vladimir Sokolovsky, uses his connections to make sure that the incident is quickly forgotten. Afterwards he deprives his son of everything and sends him to work at the very same police station with on-the-job training under the supervision of Lieutenant-Colonel Pryanikov. Initially, Igor hates his new life, but after passing through humiliation from his comrades, he gradually matures, meets his love – Captain Viktoriya Rodionova, and sets out to investigate the death of his mother who supposedly killed herself 20 years ago.

Igor Sokolovsky is arrested for the attempted murder of oligarch Arkadiy Ignatiev. He spends half a year in the penitentiary.

Season Two
Unexpectedly for everyone, Igor Sokolovsky is released from jail, as businessman Ignatiev has taken back his claim. Igor goes to freedom with the desire to take revenge, because he considers Ignatiev guilty of the death of his parents. The silver spooned one is restored in service, he leads his father's firm, passed to him by inheritance, starts a romance with Katya, the daughter of Ignatiev himself. Conflicts with Danila Korolev over Vika continue: between Igor and Vika there are still feelings left. And day after day hastens the denouement – the destruction of Ignatiev.

Season Three
Igor Sokolovsky has long ceased to be the Silver Spoon, for which the police service is a necessary link. His mother's death and the recent murder of his father – the two events that shaped his subsequent life can be explained largely due to this service. Silver Spoon grows as a professional every day working on the disclosure of various crimes, but the investigation of the main drama of his life puts before them new challenges. To avenge the death of his father, he mastered the business strategies, to find and punish the murderer of his mother, he needs to master something completely new. And the most difficult thing is to stay within the law. In search of the culprit in Silver Spoon will be the features but will he have the legal means to punish the murderer?

South Korean adaptation
On June 18, 2019, it was confirmed that Silver Spoon will be remade as a Korean drama series. Produced by Super Moon Pictures (Goodbye to Goodbye, My Strange Hero), it will be aired in 2020.

References

External links

Fictional portrayals of the Moscow City Police
2014 Russian television series debuts
2000s Russian television series
Russian crime television series
Channel One Russia original programming
Television series by Sreda